16 Vulpeculae is a binary star system in the northern constellation Vulpecula. It has a combined apparent visual magnitude of 5.787, which is near the lower limit of visibility to the naked eye. The system is moving closer to the Sun with a heliocentric radial velocity of about −37 km/s. It will make its closest approach in about 0.9 million years, coming within .

The pair orbit each other with an estimated period of 1,201 years and an orbital eccentricity of 0.932. The magnitude 5.93 primary, component A, displays a stellar classification of F2III, matching an aging F-type giant star. This star is spinning rapidly with a projected rotational velocity of 136 km/s. This is giving the star an oblate shape with an equatorial bulge that is an estimated 21% larger than the polar radius. It is 742 million years old with 1.34 times the mass of the Sun. The star is radiating 31 times the Sun's luminosity from its photosphere at an effective temperature of about 6,888 K.

References

Vulpeculae, 16
Vulpecula
F-type giants
Binary stars
Durchmusterung objects
190004
098636
7657